Tony Schumacher (born 19 November 1976) is an Australian sprint kayaker who competed in the early 2000s. At the 2008 Summer Olympics in Beijing, he was surprisingly eliminated in the semifinals of the K-4 1000 m event after entering the event as gold medal favourites.

References

External links
Sports-Reference.com profile

1976 births
Australian male canoeists
Canoeists at the 2008 Summer Olympics
Living people
Olympic canoeists of Australia
21st-century Australian people